The EADS PZL PZL-112 Junior is a Polish single engine, two-seat trainer built by PZL Warszawa-Okecie.

Development and design
The PZL-112 Junior was designed by PZL Warszawa-Okecie in collaboration with the Warsaw University of Technology as a low-cost trainer for Polish flying clubs. It was originally known as the Koliber Junior as it used some components from the PZL-110 Koliber. The Junior is a metal low-wing cantilever monoplane with a swept back vertical tail and a small ventral fin. It has a fixed tricycle landing gear and is powered by a nose-mounted Lycoming O-235-L2C flat-four piston engine driving a two-bladed propeller. It has two side-by-side configuration seats in an enclosed cabin with a gull-wing canopy. Construction of the prototype was started in 1997 and it first flew on 17 Jun 2000.

Specifications

See also

References

Notes

Bibliography

PZL aircraft
2000s Polish civil trainer aircraft
Single-engined tractor aircraft
Low-wing aircraft